Launched from the Lower East Side, Manhattan in 1983 as a subscription only bimonthly publication, the Tellus Audio Cassette Magazine utilized the audio cassette medium to distribute no wave downtown music and audio art and was in activity for the ten years of 1983–1993.

The Tellus Project 

Tellus publishers and executive editors – visual artist and noise music composer Joseph Nechvatal; former curator-director of the Institute of Contemporary Art, Philadelphia and current curator-director of The Jewish Museum, Claudia Gould; and new music composer and director of Harvestworks, Carol Parkinson – conceived of the compact cassette medium as a no wave Fluxus-inspired media art form in itself.

Nechvatal and Parkinson had met in the mid-1970s and performed in a performance art / minimal art dance trio with Cid Collins influenced by the post-Merce Cunningham postmodern dance/choreography of Deborah Hay (with whom they studied in 1977) and Carolee Schneemann (with whom they toured Europe in 1978). In 1979, Nechvatal, Collins and Parkinson had organized the five night Public Arts International/Free Speech performance art festival in May at 75 Warren Street in Manhattan and Nechvatal and Parkinson continued to see each other in the art music milieu of the downtown minimal music scene, as they worked for the Dia Art Foundation as archivist (Nechvatal) and assistant (Parkinson) to La Monte Young.

Nechvatal, who originated the concept of the project, chose the name Tellus from Tellus Mater, the Roman earth goddess of fecundity. In 2007, French music blogger Continuo and Stephen McLaughlin created an online mp3 archive of all of the Tellus tracks and accessibly archived them at Ubuweb.

Influence 
Ego Masher (1983) 07:05 by Joseph Nechvatal - from Tellus #1 - has been anthologized on the CD An Anthology of Noise & Electronic Music #6.
Tellus Audio Cassette Magazine has been mentioned as an inspiration to the opening of the Sound Art Museum in Rome (2007). 
An exhibition was held at Printed Matter, Inc. in New York City devoted to current American cassette culture entitled Leaderless: Underground Cassette Culture Now (May 12–26, 2007) that referred to the influence of Tellus.
In 2011, selections from early Tellus Audio Cassette Magazine recordings were included in MoMA's exhibition Looking at Music 3.0.
In September 2011, Tellus Audio Cassette Magazine was the sole subject of a Kontra Bass (BSSX) internet radio broadcast originating in Serbia.
In February 2011, issues of Artforum (with images of covers) and ARTnews covered Tellus Audio Cassette Magazine.
In 2013, Devon Maloney, at Wired Magazine, reports that Master Cactus: The Art Zine Available Only on Cassette, was directly inspired by Tellus Audio Cassette Magazine.
In 2016, Multi-genre compiler and NTS radio host Jaro Sounder created and streamed Tellus Audio Cassette Magazine Selections Vol. 1 (1983-1993) on Bandcamp.
In 2017, curator Tom Leeser created an audio homage to Tellus titled Imagining Tellus # 28: Heard in LA, stating that "The Tellus Project, produced and curated by Carol Parkinson, Joseph Nechvatal and Claudia Gould, is now considered a historic and significant archive of experimental sound, noise, performance and spoken word artists from the 1980s."
In 2018, Adrian Rew of Blank Forms, a curatorial platform focused on the presentation and preservation of experimental performance, spoke with Tellus Audio Cassette Magazine co-founder Carol Parkinson on Montez Press Radio to discuss the history of the pioneering sound art label and play selections from its tape-o-graphy. 
In 2019, Ego Masher (1983) by Joseph Nechvatal from Tellus #1 was included on the audio anthology Manic Antenna 34: Move On Up!
In 2020, Kenneth Goldsmith writes in his book Duchamp Is My Lawyer: The Polemics, Pragmatics, and Poetics of Ubuweb that "Perhaps no collection of audio inspired UbuWeb more than the Tellus cassettes…."
On June 24, 2021, a two-hour Tellus Audio Cassette Magazine Special aired on Dublab with Tellus co-founders Carol Parkinson and Joseph Nechvatal joining Dublab host Frosty for a survey of the Tellus mission and history and a selection of Tellus archival recordings.
June 17, 2022, music historian Paul Paulun published at Sounds Central an audio program of his selected Tellus Audio Cassette Magazine tracks called Tellus: New York City’s Art Scene on Tape (1983-1993)

Tellus cassettography

References

External links 
  Official Tellus Audio Cassette Magazine page at Harvestworks
  Tellus Audio Cassette Magazine cassettography archive at Ubuweb

Visual arts magazines published in the United States
Bimonthly magazines published in the United States
Music magazines published in the United States
Audio periodicals
Magazines established in 1983
Magazines published in New York City
Cassette magazines
Cassette culture 1970s–1990s